Sunset Carson Rides Again is a 1948 American Western film produced and directed by Oliver Drake and shot on his own ranch. Filmed in 1947 in Kodachrome on 16mm film, the film was the first of Drake's Yucca Pictures Corporation to star Sunset Carson. The film was released by Astor Pictures Corporation in 35mm Cinecolor.

Plot summary 
Bob Ward comes out West to seek vengeance on his father's murderer. Jumping off a freight train he becomes lost in the desert and drinks water out of a poison spring with near fatal consequences. He is rescued by none other that Sunset Carson who Bob believes murdered his father.

Keeping his name a secret, Ward is nursed to health by Sunset's sister Joan. He becomes enemies with Sunset's partner and foreman Sam Webster. Seeing Sam mistreat a horse, the two begin brawling. Sunset decides to give the men a chance to have a fight, but the brawl will become a boxing match with the proceeds to go to erect the area's first schoolhouse. However Sam has a scheme to obtain the money himself and get rid of Sunset and Bob Ward simultaneously.

Cast 
Sunset Carson
Al Terry as Bob Ward aka Kansas Kid
Pat Starling as Joan Carson
John L. Cason as Sam Webster
Dan White as Sheriff Norton
Pat Gleason as Referee Brown
Stephen Keyes as Henchman Murdock
Ron Ormond as Jim Pizor (Henchman)
Bob Curtis as "Tin-Cup" Callahan
Joe Hiser as "Shorty" McDuff
Bill Vall as "Slugger" Appolodamus
Forrest Matthews as Sam Nevens
Don Gray as Henchman Rand
Dale Harrison as Tomkins
The Rodeo Revelers as Musicians

Soundtrack

References

External links 

1948 films
1948 Western (genre) films
American Western (genre) films
Cinecolor films
Films directed by Oliver Drake
Astor Pictures films
1940s English-language films
1940s American films